MSC Seascape is a Seaside EVO-class cruise ship built for MSC Cruises at the Fincantieri shipyard in Monfalcone, Italy. The leader of her sub-class is the MSC Seashore, who was delivered to MSC Cruises in July 2022. This class is a larger version of the main Seaside class of cruise ships.

History

Planning and construction 
On 29 November 2017, at the delivery ceremony of MSC Seaside, MSC announced it had signed an order with Italian shipbuilder Fincantieri worth €1.8 billion for two new cruise ships, scheduled for delivery in 2021 and 2023, respectively. The two ships would make up the Seaside EVO-class, described as a "further evolution of the Seaside-class prototype" established by MSC Seaside and MSC Seaview. The order for the first Seaside EVO ship replaced an order originally placed for a third Seaside-class vessel. MSC Seascape is described to be the largest and most technologically advanced ship ever built in Italy.

The MSC Seascape's naming ceremony was held on 7 December 2022 at the Manhattan Cruise Terminal.

On 19 January 2023, a power loss (technical issue with one of the engines) caused a reduced maximum speed. This resulted in one port of call being replaced. Apparently there was "great danger" if the second engine failed.

Operational career 
MSC Seascape started her career with a repositioning cruise from the Mediterranean to North America. This cruise happened on November 19, 2022. After arriving in New York, she sailed down to Miami to begin her main career in the region on 11 December 2022.

Design and specifications 
MSC Seascape is 1112.2 ft. long and has a beam of 135 ft. She measures 243 feet high. MSC Seascape is 20 decks tall Her gross tonnage is 169,400 GT. She has a maximum passenger capacity of 5,179 passengers and 1,648 crew members. The ship holds emphasis on outdoor spaces, with a narrower superstructure and larger promenade areas. Many safety features, environmentally friendly policies, and other minor details are borrowed from her sister ship MSC Seashore. A new attraction known as the Robotron has been featured near the ship's pool deck aft, where the Marina Pool lies on deck 18. The robotron lies right next to the sports arena, located on deck 20.

References 

MSC Cruises
Ships built by Fincantieri
2022 ships
Cruise ships of Italy